The  Sarawak Native People's Party or  (PBDS) was a political party in the state of Sarawak in Malaysia. It was established in 1983, by Datuk Amar Leo Moggie Irok, after seceding from Sarawak National Party (SNAP) following his loss in the contest for the SNAP's president post against Datuk Amar James Wong Kim Ming.

PBDS, as a breakaway of SNAP, won 15 seats in the 1987 Sarawak state election, while its ally, Sarawak Malaysian People's Association (PERMAS), won only 5 seats. Overall, the PBDS won 28 constituencies with PBB 14; SUPP 11 and SNAP 3. In both cases, SNAP and PBDS (both parties now defunct) joined the Malaysian National Front or Barisan Nasional (BN) as the ruling coalition.

The party was dissolved twice, firstly in 2003 and secondly in 2004 due to leadership crisis between Datuk Daniel Tajem Miri as the PBDS president and Dr James Jemut Masing as the challenger with the latter leaves the party and founded Parti Rakyat Sarawak in 2003.

The dissolution of PBDS led to the formation two offshoot parties; one is Parti Rakyat Sarawak (PRS) led by Datuk Dr James Jemut Masing and Datuk Sng Chee Hua which was successfully registered and admitted into BN in 2004 while another Malaysian Dayak Congress (MDC) failed to be registered by the Registrar of Societies (RoS). Meanwhile, there was also an attempt to revive PBDS and it was finally successfully approved and re-registered as Parti Bansa Dayak Sarawak (Baru) in 2013.

General election results

State election results

References

Further reading

See also
Dayak people
Politics of Malaysia
List of political parties in Malaysia

Defunct political parties in Sarawak
1983 establishments in Malaysia
2004 disestablishments in Malaysia
Political parties established in 1983
Political parties disestablished in 2004
Ethnic political parties
Indigenist political parties